Gisele's Mania is a 1996 Russian biographical drama film directed by Aleksey Uchitel.

Plot 
The film tells the love stories of the famous Russian ballerina Olga Spesivtseva.

Cast 
 Galina Tyunina as Olga Spesivtseva
 Mikhail Kozakov as Akim Volynsky
 Evgeniy Sidikhin as Boris Kaplun
 Andrei Smirnov as George Brown
 Sergey Vinogradov as Anton Dolin
 Ivan Okhlobystin as Serge Lifar
 Aleksandr Khvan
 Tatyana Moskvina as Nurse
 Aleksey German as Doctor
 Aleksandr Timofeyev

References

External links 
 

1996 films
1990s Russian-language films
Russian biographical drama films
1990s biographical drama films